Sergey Sergeyevich Chernyshev (born 27 April 1990) is an Azerbaijani professional association football player.

Career 
The striker played during his career for the FC Rostov (reserves), FC Rostov-2, FC Taganrog and FK Mughan.

In January 2017, Chernyshev joined Sumgayit, before joining Kapaz PFK in July 2017. On 2 January 2018, Kapaz announced that Chernyshev had left the club by mutual consent.

Career statistics

Club

References

1990 births
People from Shebekino
Living people
Association football forwards
Azerbaijani footballers
Azerbaijani expatriate footballers
Azerbaijan under-21 international footballers
Azerbaijan youth international footballers
Azerbaijan Premier League players
FK Mughan players
Ravan Baku FC players
FC Taganrog players
FC Dynamo Stavropol players
Kapaz PFK players
FC Rostov players
FC SKA Rostov-on-Don players